Carlo Rustichelli (24 December 1916 – 13 November 2004) was an Italian film composer whose career spanned the 1940s to about 1990. His prolific output included about 250 film compositions, as well as arrangements for other films, and music for television.

Life
Born in Carpi, Emilia-Romagna to a family of music lovers, he gained a diploma in piano at the Conservatorio Giovanni Battista Martini in Bologna, going on to Rome where he studied composition at the Santa Cecilia Academy.

He had a wife (Evi), a son (Paolo, also a composer), and a daughter (Alida).

Career
He met Fellini in post-war Rome, and probably through him met Pietro Germi, for whom he composed his first major film score for Gioventù perduta (Lost Youth), and with whom he was most associated. He composed music for many Germi films in the 1940s, 50s and 60s.

In 1972 he was commissioned by Billy Wilder to compose the music for Avanti!.

Selected filmography

The Lion of Amalfi (Il Leone di Amalfi) - 1950
 The Crossroads (1951)
 Lorenzaccio (1951)
 The Enemy (1952)
The Blind Woman of Sorrento (La cieca di Sorrento) - 1952
The Bandit of Tacca Del Lupo (Il brigante di Tacca del Lupo) - 1952
 The Legend of the Piave (1952)
Prisoner in the Tower of Fire (La prigioniera della torre di fuoco) - 1953
Captain Phantom (Capitan Fantasma) - 1953
Mid-Century Loves (Amori di mezzo secolo) - 1954
 Laugh! Laugh! Laugh! (1954)
 Cardinal Lambertini (1954)
 Disowned (1954)
 Desperate Farewell (1955)
 The Two Friends (1955)
 Rommel's Treasure (1955)
They Stole a Tram (Hanno rubato un tram) - 1956
The Railroad Man (Il Ferroviere) - 1956
Fathers and Sons (Padri e figli) - 1957
A Man of Straw (L'uomo di paglia) - 1958
The Day the Sky Exploded (La morte viene dallo spazio) - 1958
 The Facts of Murder - 1959
You're on Your Own (Arrangiatevi!) - 1959
Hannibal (Annibale) - 1959
The Giants of Thessaly (I giganti della Tessaglia) - 1960
Minotaur, the Wild Beast of Crete (Teseo contro il Minotauro) - 1960
Some Like It Cold (A noi piace freddo...!) - 1960
Long Night in 1943 (La lunga notte del '43) - 1960
Love in Rome (Un amore a Roma) - 1960
Divorce Italian Style (Divorzio all'italiana) - 1961
The Thief of Baghdad - 1961
Nefertiti, Queen of the Nile (Nefertiti, reina del Nilo) - 1961
The Four Days of Naples (Le Quattro giornate di Napoli) - 1962
La commare secca - 1962
Ro.Go.Pa.G. - 1963
The Whip and the Body (La frusta e il corpo) - 1963
The Lion of St. Mark (Il Leone di San Marco) - 1963
Hercules vs. Moloch - 1963
La ragazza di Bube - 1963
 Coriolanus: Hero without a Country (Coriolano: eroe senza patria) - 1963
The Organizer (I compagni) - 1963
Seduced and Abandoned (Sedotta e abbandonata) - 1964
Giants of Rome (I giganti di Roma) - 1964
Terror of the Steppes (I predoni della steppa) - 1964)
 Desert Raiders (Il dominatore del deserto) (1964)
Samson vs. the Giant King (Maciste alla corte dello zar) - 1964
 The Betrothed (I promessi sposi)) - 1964
Blood and Black Lace (Sei donne per l'assassino) - 1964
Buffalo Bill, Hero of the Far West (Buffalo Bill, l'eroe del far west) - 1964
The Long Hair of Death (I lunghi capelli della morte) - 1964
 Sandokan to the Rescue (1964)
 Sandokan Against the Leopard of Sarawak (1964)
 Made in Italy (1965)
 Ringo's Big Night (La grande notte di Ringo) - 1966
 The Birds, the Bees and the Italians (Signore & Signori) - 1966
 Me, Me, Me... and the Others (Io, io, io... e gli altri) - 1966
Seasons of Our Love (Le stagioni del nostro amore) - 1966
L'armata Brancaleone - 1966
 No Diamonds for Ursula (1967)
 Golden Chameleon (1967)
 Kill, Baby, Kill (Operazione paura) - 1966
 Kill or Be Killed (Uccidi o muori) - 1966
God Forgives... I Don't! (Dio perdona... io no!) - 1967
One Dollar Too Many (I tre che sconvolsero il West) - 1968
Train for Durango (Un treno per Durango) - 1968
Un minuto per pregare, un istante per morire) - 1968
The Ruthless Four (Ognuno per sé) - 1968
Seven Men and One Brain - 1968
Ace High (I quattro dell'Ave Maria) - 1968
Satyricon - 1969
The Battle of El Alamein (La battaglia di El Alamein) - 1969
Blow Hot, Blow Cold (Violenza al sole) - 1969
Boot Hill (La collina degli stivali) - 1969
Mafia Connection (E venne il giorno dei limoni neri) - 1970
Brancaleone at the Crusades (Brancaleone alle Crociate) - 1970
A Pocketful of Chestnuts (Le castagne sono buone) - 1970
 A Sword for Brando (Una spada per Brando) (1970)
Bubù - 1971
In the Name of the Italian People (In nome del popolo italiano) - 1971
Sergeant Klems - 1971
The Call of the Wild - 1972
Alfredo, Alfredo - 1972
Avanti! - 1972
We Want the Colonels (Vogliamo i colonnelli) - 1973
Dirty Weekend (Mordi e fuggi) - 1973
Gang War in Milan (Milano rovente) - 1973
The Black Hand (La mano nera) - 1973
Little Funny Guy (L'emigrante) - 1973
White Fang (Zanna Bianca) - 1973
Challenge to White Fang (Il ritorno di Zanna Bianca) - 1974
White Fang to the Rescue (Zanna Bianca alla riscossa) - 1974
Salvo D'Acquisto - 1974
Somewhere Beyond Love (Delitto d'amore) - 1974
City Under Siege (Un uomo, una città) - 1974
Cormack of the Mounties (Giubbe rosse) - 1975
Il gatto mammone - 1975
 My Friends (Amici miei)) - 1975
 A Woman at Her Window (Une femme à sa fenêtre) - 1976
Le Gang - 1977
 Man in a Hurry (L'Homme pressé) - 1977
 Safari Rally (6000 km di paura) - 1978
 Assassination on the Tiber (Assassinio sul Tevere) - 1979
Forest of Love (Bosco d'amore) - 1981
All My Friends Part 2 (Amici miei Atto II) - 1982
Heads I Win, Tails You Lose (Testa o croce) - 1982
Blade Master (Ator 2 - L'invincibile Orion) - 1984
 Woman of Wonders (La donna delle meraviglie) - 1985

Notes

References
"Prolific and versatile father of Italian cinema music: Carlo Rustichelli, Film composer, 1916-2004", The Sydney Morning Herald, Weekend edition, December 4–5, 2004, p. 60

External links

1916 births
2004 deaths
People from Carpi, Emilia-Romagna
Italian film score composers
Italian male composers
Spaghetti Western composers
Accademia Nazionale di Santa Cecilia alumni
Nastro d'Argento winners
20th-century Italian musicians
Conservatorio Giovanni Battista Martini alumni
Italian male film score composers
20th-century Italian male musicians
Musicians from the Province of Modena
Film people from the Province of Modena